Highs in the Mid-Sixties, Volume 12 (subtitled Texas, Part 2) is a compilation album in the Highs in the Mid-Sixties series, featuring recordings that were released in Texas.  This is one of five volumes in the series that collects songs by Texas bands; the others are Highs in the Mid-Sixties, Volume 11, Highs in the Mid-Sixties, Volume 13, Highs in the Mid-Sixties, Volume 17, and Highs in the Mid-Sixties, Volume 23.

Release data
This album was released in 1984 as an LP by AIP Records (as #AIP-10021).

Notes on the tracks
Gary P. Nunn was evidently a member of the New Roadrunners; he was later in the Lost Gonzo Band and has released more than a dozen albums as a solo artist.  His song "London Homesick Blues" has been used as the theme song for Austin City Limits for over 20 years.

Track listing

Side 1

 Tommy Jett: "Groovy Little Trip" (Tommy Jett)
 The Derby-Hatville: "Turn into Earth" (The Yardbirds)
 The Mind's Eye: "Help, I'm Lost" (S. Perrone/L. Cabaza)
 The New Roadrunners: "Tired of Living" (Gary P. Nunn)
 The Remaining Few: "Painted Air" (Mike Jones/Robert Specht)
 The Stereo Shoestring: "On the Road South" (The Stereo Shoestring) — rel. 1968
 Thursday's Children: "Air-Conditioned Man" (C. Helpinstill) — rel. 1966

Side 2
 The Buckle: "I've Got Something on My Mind" (Cameron/Martin/Brown)
 The Brentwoods: "Babe, You Know" (Alyse Paradiso) — rel. 1967
 The Crabs]]: "Chase Yourself" (R. Leff) — rel. 1967
 The Trackers: "You Are My World" (The Trackers)
 The Soul Seekers: "Good Revelations" (The Soul Seekers)
 The Y'All's: "Run for Your Life" (John Lennon/Paul McCartney)
 Leo and the Prophets: "Parking Meter" (The Prophets)

Pebbles (series) albums
1984 compilation albums
Music of Texas